Chacchoben (chak-CHO-ben; Maya for "the place of red corn") is a Maya ruin approximately 110 mi (177 km) south of Tulum and 7 mi (11 km) from the village from which it derives its name.

History 
Settlement by the Maya at the site is estimated at 200 BC, and the structures date from 700 AD. It is characterised by large temples and massive platform groups.

Modern discovery 
In the 1940s a farm was established near the site by the Cohuo family.  The site was reported visited by archeologist Loring Hewen and briefly described in a letter to ethnohistorian Ralph Roys in 1962. The principal pyramid was apparently then still used as a site for religious worship. The ruins were officially reported to the Mexican government in June 1972 by Dr. Peter Harrison, an American archaeologist who was working on a project for The Royal Ontario Museum, and who also made the first maps of Chacchoben. Harrison stumbled upon this site while flying a helicopter over Mexico and noticed numerous hills in predominantly flat lands.  Harrison realized there were temples beneath these hills, which were naturally covered over a period of 2000 years.

Restoration 
In 1994 the Mexican National Institute of Anthropology and History (INAH) excavated and restored the site, which was closed to the public until 2002. Today one temple is still overgrown with nature, and they were unable to restore it.

Chacchoben today 

Visitors to the site today walk a circular path that includes three excavated and restored pyramids, as well as many walls and staircases.  Excavation is continuing on several mounds which are known to contain further buildings.  Some structures still bear traces of the red paint with which they were originally coated, and INAH has set up shaded areas to prevent further degradation of this pigment by the sun.  Also notable at the base of the largest pyramid is a large stone slab called a stela with a Maya hieroglyphic inscription.  Chacchoben is one of the more popular ruin sites in southern Quintana Roo, with regular tourist trips from the port of Costa Maya.

The surrounding jungle is characterized by abundant species of fauna, such as deer, peccary, armadillo, gray fox, spider monkey and howler monkey.  Deeper into the jungle, more dangerous animals like jaguar, ocelot, puma and tapir can be found.

Image gallery

External links 
Official INAH site.  In Spanish.
Chacchoben tourism site

References

Maya sites in Quintana Roo
Former populated places in Mexico
Tourist attractions in Quintana Roo